How Vitka Chesnok Drove Lyokha Shtyr to the House for Disabled is a Russian crime drama film directed by Aleksandr Khant. It stars Aleksei Serebryakov and 
Yevgeny Tkachuk.

Plot 
27-year-old Vitka Chesnok, a man who grew up in a children's home, dreams of escaping from his wife and son, who prevent him from living the life he wants. He was unloved during his childhood and developed a hardened heart. Vitya meets his father, a felon, and now also a cripple. Vitka decides to take his father to a disabled home, not knowing what adventures and dangers await them on the way.

Cast
 Aleksey Serebryakov as Lyokha Shtyr
Yevgeny Tkachuk as Vitka Chesnok
 Dmitry Arkhangelsky as Chebur

 Sergey Bukreev as Sorokin
 Georgy Kudrenko as Mishka Kum
 Olga Lapshina as mother-in-law
 Andrey Smirnov as Platon
 Natalia Vdovina as Vera

Awards
 Karlovy Vary International Film Festival: Best Director (Aleksandr Khant)
 Nika Award: Discovery of the Year (Aleksandr Khant)

References

External links 
 

2010s Russian-language films
2017 films
2017 crime drama films
2010s drama road movies
Films set in Russia
Films shot in Russia
Russian crime drama films
Russian drama road movies